Barrows is an unincorporated community in Crow Wing Township, Crow Wing County, Minnesota, United States, near Brainerd. It is located along Business Highway 371 (MN 371) near Depot Street, Barrows Avenue, and 70th Avenue.

A post office called Barrows was established in 1911, and remained in operation until 1924. The community was named for W. A. Barrows, Jr.

References

Unincorporated communities in Crow Wing County, Minnesota
Unincorporated communities in Minnesota